Club Deportivo El Nacional (until 2018 Club Especializado de Alto Rendimiento El Nacional) is an Ecuadorian sports club from Quito, known best for their professional football team. The team currently plays in the Serie A, the first-tier football league in the country after gaining promotion in 2022.

El Nacional has thirteen national championships (one less than Emelec and three less than Barcelona). The club has participated in more Copa Libertadores than any other club in Ecuador with 22 appearances. Their best performance in the continental tournament was as a semi-finalist in 1985.

El Nacional was founded on 1 June 1964, and was administered by the Ecuadorian Military since the foundation until 2013, when the club celebrated its first ever democratic elections. The club has maintained a tradition of only playing Ecuadorian footballers, which has given them the nickname of Puros Criollos ("Pure Natives"). Rival clubs included crosstown clubs LDU Quito, Deportivo Quito, Universidad Católica and the Guayaquileans Barcelona and Emelec. Their home stadium is Estadio Olímpico Atahualpa.

Other sports the organization participates in are gymnastics, table tennis, Ecuavolley, chess, and shooting.

History

The Bi-Tri Campeon
In the 1970s, El Nacional was able to achieve what no Ecuadorian team had done in the history of the league. In 1976, 1977, 1978 they were unbeatable champions. Fabián Paz y Miño stepped up as the leading goal scorer in the league in 1977 to help El Nacional during those three years of glory. In 1982, 1983, 1984 El Nacional repeated this feat to become double three-time championship winners. Their title count became eight. This was gained by help from two legendary players Jose Villafuerte and Ermen Benitez. In 1985 they accomplished their most important feat in international competition reaching semi-finals in the Copa Libertadores. One year later they added to their titles by being crowned for the ninth time in their history.

The 1990s
El Nacional produced some of the greatest players in Ecuador and won two more championships in 1992 and 1996 with the help of Cléber Chalá, Agustín Delgado, and Oswaldo Ibarra. They also disputed the semi-finals of the Copa Conmebol 1992 and the 1994 edition.

Present
The current success of the team has added two more championships in 2005 and 2006 bringing their total to 13 titles. El Nacional has brought up talented players such as Antonio Valencia, Segundo Alejandro Castillo, Christian Benítez and Felix Borja. There have been plans to build a new stadium but no official decision has been taken yet. Former coach Juan Carlos Burbano resigned after an unsuccessful first stage in the league. Julio Asad was appointed head coach on 16 July 2009.

Stadium
El Nacional play their home matches in the Estadio Olímpico Atahualpa. Plans have been enabled to build a new stadium, however no official decision has been taken. The management even showed the model of what the 42,000-seat stadium would look like.

Supporters
On 13 May 1998, a group of friends met and decided to form a highly dedicated fanbase called La Marea Roja (English: The Red Tide). Over the years, they aimed to integrate more people, and becoming a better organized to be the largest fan group of El Nacional. It is made up of over 250 members, with members owning proper identification cards. La Marea Roja stands at the south part of the stadium for 90 minutes every game, which attracts adults, women and large numbers of children.

Honours
National
Serie A (13): 1967, 1973, 1976, 1977, 1978, 1982, 1983, 1984, 1986, 1992, 1996, 2005 Clausura, 2006
Serie B (1): 1979 E2.

Players

Current squad

Out on loan

World Cup players
The following players were chosen to represent their country at the FIFA World Cup while contracted to El Nacional.

 Juan Carlos Burbano (2002)
 Cléber Chalá (2002)
 Ángel Fernández (2002)
 Oswaldo Ibarra (2002)
 Christian Benítez (2006)
 Félix Borja (2006)
 Segundo Castillo (2006)
 Jorge Guagua (2006)
 Christian Lara (2006)
 Adrián Bone (2014)

Managers

Noted managers
The following managers won at least one trophy while in charge of El Nacional:
 Vessilio Bártoli (won the 1967 Serie A)
 Héctor Morales (first tenure, won the 1973 Serie A; second tenure, won the 1977 and 1978 Serie A)
 Ernesto Guerra (won the 1976, 1982, and 1992 Serie A in three tenures)
 Roberto Abruzzesse (won the 1983, 1984, and 1986 Serie A)
 Paulo Massa (won the 1996 Serie A)
 Ever Hugo Almeida (won the 2005 Clausura & 2006 Serie A)

References

External links
Official Website 

 
El Nacional, Club Deportivo
El Nacional, Club Deportivo
El Nacional
1964 establishments in Ecuador